The Re-Volts are an American punk band based out of San Francisco, California. All of the members of the band are also in other San Francisco-area punk bands; these include the Swingin' Utters, Filthy Thieving Bastards, Me First and the Gimme Gimmes, Dead To Me, One Man Army, The Hooks, toyGuitar, U.S. Bombs and United Blood.

The band released a self-titled EP, Re-Volts themselves on CD and subsequently on 10" vinyl and CD via Pirates Press Records.  In 2018 they released the "Wages" 7" and the "Equator" flexi-disc, both on Pirates Press Records.  In 2019 they released the "Leeches" 7" on Pirates Press Records.

Members
 Spike Slawson – vocals and guitar
 Jack Dalrymple – guitar and vocals
 Paul Oxborrow – bass and vocals
 Colin Delaney – drums

Discography
 Re-Volts EP (2007) Pirates Press Records
 Wages 7" (2018) Pirates Press Records
 Equator 7" flexi-disc (2018) Pirates Press Records
 Leeches 7" (2019) Pirates Press Records

Compilations
 Rock Against Malaria (2009) Eunuch Records

Punk rock groups from California
Musical groups from San Francisco
Musical groups established in 2007